London 1 North was an English level 6, rugby union league for clubs in London and the south-east of England including sides from Bedfordshire, Buckinghamshire, Cambridgeshire, Essex, north Greater London, Hertfordshire, Norfolk, Suffolk.  When this division began in 1987 it was known as London 2 North, changing to its final name ahead of the 2009–10 season.

The fourteen teams played home and away matches from September through to April. The first placed team in the league won promotion to London & South East Premier while the league runner-up played the second placed team from London 1 South in a play-off for promotion. Relegated teams dropped to either London 2 North East or London 2 North West depending on the location of the club.

The Rugby Football Union reorganised the level six leagues for season 2022–23, with an increase from eight to twelve leahgues, and a reduction of the teams in each from fourteen to twelve. The teams in this league were transferred to either Regional 2 Anglia, Regional 2 Thames or Regional 2 East Midlands.

Teams 2021–22

The teams competing in 2021-22 achieved their places in the league based on performances in 2019–20, the 'previous season' column in the table below refers to that season not 2020–21. 

Ten of the fourteen teams from 2021–22 were placed into one of the new level six leagues for 2022–23. Amersham & Chiltern, Belsize Park and Old Haberdashers were placed into Regional 2 Thames, while Brentwood, Chingford, Eton Manor, Norwich, Southend Saxons and Thurrock were placed into Regional 2 Anglia. Leighton Buzzard were placed into Regional 2 East Midlands. The top four teams in 2021–22, Colchester, Harpenden, Shelford and Sudbury, were promoted to the level five league Regional 1 South East. No teams were relegated to level seven.

Season 2020–21

On 30 October 2020 the RFU announced  that due to the coronavirus pandemic a decision had been taken to cancel Adult Competitive Leagues (National League 1 and below) for the 2020/21 season meaning London 1 North was not contested.

Teams 2019–20

Teams 2018–19

Teams 2017–18

Teams 2016-17
Barking
Brentwood
Chelmsford (promoted from London 2 North East)
Chingford
Eton Manor (relegated from National League 3 London & SE)
Fullerians (promoted from London 2 North West)
Letchworth Garden City
North Walsham
Old Priorians 
Ruislip
Saffron Walden (promoted from London 2 North East)
Sudbury (promoted from London 2 North East)
Thurrock 
Tring

Teams 2015–16
Amersham & Chiltern, the champions, are promoted to National League 3 London & SE for next season. There are only two relegated clubs (Harrow and Luton) as East Grinstead took voluntary relegation from the National League 3 London & SE to the Sussex Leagues.

Amersham & Chiltern (relegated from National League 3 London & SE)
Barking
Brentwood
Chelmsford (promoted from London 2 North East)
Chingford
CS Rugby 1863 (relegated from National League 3 London & SE)
Harrow (promoted from London 2 North West)
Letchworth Garden City  
Luton
North Walsham
Old Priorians 
Ruislip
Thurrock 
Tring (relegated from National League 3 London & SE)

Teams 2014–15
Barking (relegated from National League 3 London & SE)
Brentwood
Chingford
Colchester
Eton Manor
Ipswich (promoted from London 2 North East)
Letchworth Garden City
Luton
North Walsham
Old Priorians (promoted from London 2 North West)
Romford & Gidea Park
Ruislip
Thurrock (relegated from National League 3 London & SE)
Woodford

Teams 2013–14
Brentwood
Chingford
Colchester
Diss
Eton Manor
Letchworth Garden City
Luton
North Walsham
Old Haberdashers
Romford & Gidea Park
Ruislip
Tabard (promoted from London 2 North West)
Westcliff (relegated from National League 3 London & SE)
Woodford (promoted from London 2 North East)

Teams 2012–13
Basildon
Beaconsfield
Brentwood
Bury St Edmunds
Chingford
Colchester
Diss
Eton Manor
Letchworth Garden City
Luton (relegated from National League 3 London & SE)
Old Haberdashers
Rochford Hundred
Romford & Gidea Park
Ruislip

Teams 2011–12
Braintree
Brentwood
Bury St Edmunds
Chingford
Colchester
Diss (relegated from National League 3 London & SE)
Eton Manor
Hammersmith & Fulham
Letchworth Garden City
North Walsham (relegated from National League 3 London & SE)
Old Colfeians
Rochford Hundred
Ruislip
Thurrock

Teams 2009–10
Braintree
Brentwood
Bury St Edmunds
Chingford
Colchester
Eton Manor
Hammersmith & Fulham
Letchworth Garden City
North Walsham
Old Colfeians
Rochford Hundred
Ruislip
Thurrock

Original teams

When league rugby began in 1987 this division (known as London 2 North) contained the following teams:

Cheshunt
Grasshoppers
Hertford
North Walsham
Norwich
Old Albanian
Old Merchant Taylors'
St. Mary's Hospital
Thurrock
Woodford

London 1 North honours

London 2 North (1987–1993)

In the first season of the English rugby union league pyramid, sponsored by Courage, there was six, tier six leagues. The initial name was London 2 North and was for teams based in London and the counties of Hertfordshire, Middlesex, Essex, Cambridgeshire, Suffolk and Norfolk. There was eleven teams in the league and each team played one match against each of the other teams, giving each team five home matches and five away matches. The winning team was awarded two points, and there was one point for each team in a drawn match.

The original London 2 North was a tier 6 league with promotion up to London 1 and relegation down to either London 3 North East or London 3 North West.

London 2 North (1993–1996)

At the end of the 1992–93 season the top six teams from London Division 1 and the top six from South West Division 1 were combined to create National 5 South.  This meant that London 2 North dropped from a tier 6 league to a tier 7 league for the years that National 5 South was active.  Promotion continued to London 1 and relegation down to either London 3 North East or London 3 North West.

London 2 North (1998–2009)

The cancellation of National 5 South at the end of the 1995–96 season meant that London 2 North reverted to being a tier 6 league.  Promotion continued to London 1 and relegation down to either London 3 North East or London 3 North West (renamed to London 2 North East and London 2 North West from the 2000–01 season onward).

London 1 North

London 2 North was renamed to London 1 North from the 2009–10 season onward.  It continued as a tier 6 league with promotion to National League 3 London & South East (formerly London 1 and currently known as London & South East Premier) and relegation to London 2 North East and London 2 North West (formerly London 3 North East and London 3 North West).

Promotion play-offs
Since the 2000–01 season there has been a play-off between the runners-up of London 1 North and London 1 South for the third and final promotion place to London & South East Premier. The team with the superior league record has home advantage in the tie.  At the end of the 2019–20 season the London 1 South teams have been the most successful with eleven wins to the London 1 North teams eight; and the home team has won promotion on thirteen occasions compared to the away teams six.

Number of league titles

Cheshunt (3)
North Walsham (2)
Shelford (2)
Staines (2)
Thurrock (2)
Tring (2)
Westcliff (2)
Amersham & Chiltern (1)
Bishop's Stortford (1)
Brentwood (1)
Bury St Edmunds (1)
Cambridge (1)
Colchester (1)
CS Rugby 1863 (1)
Diss (1)
Ealing Trailfinders (1)
Eton Manor (1)
Harlow (1)
Hertford (1)
London Nigerian (1)
London Scottish (1)
Norwich (1)
Rochford Hundred (1)
Ruislip (1)
Tabard (1)
Woodford (1)

See also
London & SE Division RFU
Eastern Counties RFU
Essex RFU
Hertfordshire RFU
Middlesex RFU
English rugby union system
Rugby union in England

Notes

References

Defunct rugby union leagues in England
2
Recurring sporting events established in 1987
Sports leagues established in 1987
Sports leagues disestablished in 2022